Cambodia Angkor Air is the national flag carrier airline of Cambodia, with its corporate headquarters and main hub in Phnom Penh. The company slogan is "Proudly Serve the Kingdom".

History

Early years 

Cambodia Angkor Air is a full-service airline founded in July 2009, by both the Cambodian Government and Vietnam Airlines with an initial capital of $100 million. It offers both Business and Economy class on-board its Airbus aircraft, while only economy class is available on-board the ATR 72. It replaced national airline Royal Air Cambodge, which ceased operations in 2001, and concentrates on serving tourist routes within Asia, most notably catering for visitors of Angkor Wat in Siem Reap. It commenced operations on 28 July 2009. The airline was established as a joint venture by the Cambodian government (51%) and Vietnam Airlines (49%), the latter allowing for codeshare flights. All of its fleet and most of its staff are leased from Vietnam Airlines. 

On 28 July 2009, Cambodia Angkor Air launched flights with its ATR 72 on the following routes; Phnom Penh – Siem Reap, Phnom Penh – Ho Chi Minh City and Siem Reap – Ho Chi Minh City. Cambodia Angkor Air started codesharing with Vietnam Airlines and uses "VN" in place of its airline code "K6" with codeshare flight numbers on Vietnam routes. On 2 September 2009, the flag carrier received a new Airbus A321.

2010s 
On 14 December 2011, the airline started up a second domestic route within Cambodia, operating 3 weekly Siem Reap – Sihanoukville services on board an ATR 72 turboprop.

On 30 November 2012, the airline commenced flights to Thailand, between Siem Reap – Bangkok Suvarnabhumi Airport daily, breaking the monopoly of Thai carrier, Bangkok Airways, on this route. The route is operated by CAA's ATR 72 turboprop. On 31 March 2013, Cambodia Angkor Air increased the frequency of Siem Reap to Bangkok, to include a second daily flight. In July later that year, it was increased again to three daily flights.

On 7 January 2013, the airline revealed the launch of Hanoi services from both its hubs at Phnom Penh and Siem Reap, with one daily flight each, on the Airbus A321. This was the second destination in Vietnam to be served by Cambodia Angkor Air. On 1 February 2013, the airline launched its second route to Bangkok Suvarnabhumi Airport from Phnom Penh. Flights are operated daily with an Airbus A321. On 6 March 2013, the airline forecasted a loss for the first time, due to the rapid expansion and increased exposure to competition. On 6 March 2013, the airline adjusted the Sihanoukville route, where the existing 3 weekly Siem Reap – Sihanoukville return service was rerouted via Phnom Penh, with the flight operating as Siem Reap – Sihanoukville– Phnom Penh – Siem Reap. On 14 July 2013, the airline commenced charter operations on the Siem Reap – Xiamen route. On 26 September 2013, the airline commenced its inaugural flights to China breaking the monopoly of China Southern Airlines who had operated a daily frequency, which switched to a frequency of 11 flights. The route is Guangzhou- Siem Reap, operating daily using an Airbus A320 On 26 December 2013, the airline commences its seasonal Siem Reap – Hangzhou route. Also on 26 December 2013, the airline commenced new scheduled services to Shanghai–Pudong from both its hubs at Siem Reap and Phnom Penh each with four flights per week with their Airbus A321 aircraft.

On 18 and 23 January 2014, Cambodia Angkor Air started its charter flight to Wenzhou and Zhengzhou. On 1 February 2014, charter flights from Sieam Reap to Fuzhou began.

On 16 January 2015, the airline launched its charter flight to Singapore Changi International Airport with an Airbus A321. On 25 October 2015, the national carrier launched new intra-Indo-China routes. There are connecting flights between Vietnam, Cambodia, and Laos. The airline plans to operate the Ho Chi Minh City – Phnom Penh – Vientiane – Hanoi route 3 times a week, using Airbus A321 aircraft. They will be using Vietnam Airline's code, VN. Vietnam Airlines operate on this route daily. Cambodia Angkor Air's K6 code will also appear on Vietnam Airlines' flight on this route. On 30 October 2015, Cambodia Angkor Air resumed its Siem Reap – Shanghai route. On 16 December 2015, the airline launched a new route, Siem Reap – Beijing, with their new A320-200. On 25 December 2015, Cambodia Angkor Air started its charter flight to Seoul-Incheon.

On 30 December 2016, the airline resumed its Siem Reap-Hanoi flight while their new A320-200 entered service in the CAAC.

On 16 April 2020, anticipating a major global travel crisis due to COVID-19, Vietnam Airlines announced that it sold its 49% stake in Cambodia Angkor Air to an undisclosed buyer.

Destinations
Cambodia Angkor Air serves the following destinations:

Codeshare agreements
Cambodia Angkor Air has codeshare agreements with the following airlines:
 Lao Airlines 
 Vietnam Airlines

Cambodia Angkor Air Flight Pass & Ancillary Products 

Cambodia Angkor Air has a partnership with USA based Optiontown to run a prepaid flight subscription platform called Flight Pass, which enables customers to pre-purchase flights at the best available price and decide when they want to travel at a later date. Under the same partnership, there is an option for passengers to upgrade their ticket to Business or First class for a low price. In addition passengers can prepurchase their preferred seat assignment, extra baggage, lounge access as well as empty seats next to them on the flight.

Fleet

As of March 2022, the Cambodia Angkor Air fleet consists of the following aircraft:

Former Aircraft
3 ATR-72-500: 2 are active, while XU-237 is now operating as VN-B220 for Vietnam Air Services Company
10 Airbus A321-200:1 is active, while other is now operating with Vietnam Airlines

Future Fleet
Cambodia Angkor Air has announced that they will add 1 new Airbus A320-200 and 1 new ATR 72.

See also
 Transport in Cambodia
 List of airlines of Cambodia

References

External links

 Official website
 How Many FIR's In Cambodia Airspace

Vietnam Airlines
Airlines established in 2009
Airlines of Cambodia
Government-owned airlines
Cambodian brands
Government-owned companies of Cambodia
Cambodian companies established in 2009